Wim Scholtmeijer  (1982) is a former Dutch Korfball player and former Dutch National Team Coach. Since 2020 has been the headcoach of PKC.
As a player Scholtmeijer won four Dutch national championships and two European championships. As the Dutch national team headcoach he won six gold medals.

Scholtmeijer father, Jantinus Scholtmeijer, was also a korfball player and coached the Polish and Australian national team.

Player career 
Scholmeijer began playing korfball at the age of 5 at ASKO (Assen).
In 2000, at the age of 18 he started university in Groningen. He then joined Nic. as this was a successful team in Groningen. Here he played for two seasons.

In 2002 he joined Fortuna to team up with Joost Preuninger and Barry Schep. In the same off-season Fortuna also acquired new headcoach Hans Heemskerk and the team revitalized.
In his first season with Fortuna, he won the Dutch national indoor championship. His second season was even better, when Fortuna first won the European indoor championship and repeated the Dutch national indoor championship.
In his third season Fortuna repeated the European indoor championship, but could not repeat a trip to the Dutch indoor finals. 

Scholmeijer then joined PKC in 2005.

In 2005, a new league was introduced; the Korfbal League and at the start of season 2005-2006, Scholtmeijer declared himself as the first ever korfball professional.
In this first season with PKC, PKC ended as number 1 in the regular competition. PKC entered the play-off versus the number four seed, Dalto. PKC lost the play-off and therefore missed the final.
However, in the same season in the outdoor competition PKC won the play-off versus Dalto and saw itself being placed in the final. In this final, PKC won with 16-13 from AKC Blauw-Wit.

In season 2006-2007 Scholtmeijer and PKC joined DOS'46 in the Korfbal League final. In this final, DOS'46 won by just 1 point; 17-16. 
The same happened in the outdoor final, where both PKC and DOS'46 were in the final. In this final, DOS'46 won with 17-13.

In season 2007-2008 PKC did not place itself for the Korfbal League final. In the outdoor competition PKC lost in the final to Dalto. After this season Scholtmeijer decided to join another team; KV TOP.

At TOP, his new team, Scholtmeijer was reunited with coach Hans Heemskerk.
In season 2008-2009 and 2009-2010 TOP did not manage to reach the play-offs in either the indoor or outdoor competition.

Season 2010-2011 was Scholmeijer's final season as a player and he closed off his career with a bang. In this season TOP won the indoor and outdoor final.

Honours 
 Dutch champion indoor, 3x (2003, 2004 and 2011)
 Dutch champion outdoor, 1x (2011)
 Europacup champion, 2x (2004, 2005)

Dutch National Team 
Scholtmeijer was selected in 2003 to the National Team by headcoach Jan Sjouke van den Bos. Scholtmeijer participated in four international tournaments, winning gold at all appearances. 
Scholtmeijer won the individual award of Best Player of the Tournament at the 2003 World Championship.

Coaching career

Dutch National Team headcoach
In 2014 Scholtmeijer replaced Jan Sjouke van den Bos as the headcoach of the Dutch National Team.
In this role he won gold medals at six international tournaments. In 2020, after six years in service, Scholtmeijer was replaced by Jan Niebeek.

PKC
In 2020 Scholtmeijer joined his former teammate Jennifer Tromp to be the new coaching staff for PKC.

References 
 Spelerspaspoort Korfbal League
 IKF official page
 

1982 births
Living people
Dutch korfballers